Vladimir Tica (born June 11, 1981) is a Serbian former professional basketball player. He is a 2.08 m tall center.

National team
With a Serbian national under-16 basketball team, he won a gold medal at the 1997 Eurobasket.

External links
 Vladimir Tica at euroleague.net
 Vladimir Tica at eurobasket.com

1981 births
Living people
ABA League players
AZS Koszalin players
Basketball Löwen Braunschweig players
BC Khimik players
BC Zenit Saint Petersburg players
Belfius Mons-Hainaut players
Bosnia and Herzegovina expatriate basketball people in Serbia
Centers (basketball)
CSU Asesoft Ploiești players
KK Budućnost players
KK Crvena zvezda players
KK Hemofarm players
People from Doboj
Serbian expatriate basketball people in Belgium
Serbian expatriate basketball people in Germany
Serbian expatriate basketball people in Montenegro
Serbian expatriate basketball people in Poland
Serbian expatriate basketball people in Romania
Serbian expatriate basketball people in Russia
Serbian expatriate basketball people in Ukraine
Serbian men's basketball players
Serbs of Bosnia and Herzegovina
Universiade medalists in basketball
Universiade gold medalists for Serbia and Montenegro
Universiade silver medalists for Serbia and Montenegro
Medalists at the 2001 Summer Universiade